Paracomeron aurivilliusi is a species of beetle in the family Cerambycidae, and the only species in the genus Paracomeron. It was described by Heller in 1913.

References

Pteropliini
Beetles described in 1913